Dilbagh Singh is a Punjabi language singer-songwriter and film actor. Singh was born in Delhi, but is currently based in Mumbai, India.

Musical career 
In 2014, Dilbagh Singh gave the hit song "Thodi Jinni Peeti Hai". Dilbagh Singh sang the hit song "Mari Gali" for the soundtrack of the 2015 film Tanu Weds Manu: Returns. In 2016, Singh was a celebrity judge at the Delhi College of Arts and Commerce's auditions for the Oppo Delhi Times Fresh Face 2016 competition.

Singh claims Kishore Kumar, Jagjit Singh, and Gurdas Mann as among his musical inspirations. Singh typically performs eight to ten international shows abroad in a year, and double that in India. Despite being a Punjabi singer, he has also performed in states such as Tamil Nadu, Hyderabad, Assam and West Bengal.

Singh has also acted in a Bollywood movie in the year 2018 which costars Rahul Bagga, rajpal yadav and Mustaq Khan. He was initially signed for just lending his voice to the songs in the movie, but the filmmakers soon realised that Singh's jovial nature suited a character in the movie and they brought him on board as an actor also.

References

Living people
Punjabi-language singers
Male actors from Delhi
Punjabi-language lyricists
Year of birth missing (living people)